Akhona Kula (born 28 January 1990) is a South African cricketer. He was included in Northern Cape's squad for the 2016 Africa T20 Cup.

References

External links
 

1990 births
Living people
South African cricketers
Eastern Province cricketers
Northern Cape cricketers
People from Uitenhage
Cricketers from the Eastern Cape